Danica Novgorodoff is a graphic novelist, painter, illustrator, graphic designer, and writer from Brooklyn, New York and Louisville, Kentucky. She was awarded a 2015 New York Foundation for the Arts fellowship in Literature, was named Sarabande Books’ 2016 writer in residence, and received a 2020 Café Royal Cultural Foundation grant in literature. Her art and writing have been published in MoMA Magazine, Best American Comics, The Believer, Artforum, Esquire, VQR, Slate, Orion, Seneca Review, Ecotone Journal, The Arkansas International, and others.

Career
Novgorodoff's first graphic novel, A Late Freeze, was self-published in 2006 and won the Isotope Award for excellence in mini-comics, and her graphic novel, Refresh, Refresh, was included in Best American Comics in 2011. Her book, The Undertaking of Lily Chen, was published in March 2014. In 2020, Novgorodoff's graphic novel adaptation of Long Way Down, by Jason Reynolds, was published by Simon and Schuster and won the 2022 Kate Greenaway Medal.

Novgorodoff is a graduate of Yale University and, from 1999 to 2003, worked an assistant to photographer Sally Mann.

Bibliography

 A Late Freeze, 2006
 Slow Storm, 2008
 Refresh, Refresh, with James Ponsoldt and James Percy, 2009
 The Undertaking of Lily Chen, 2014
 Long Way Down, adapted from the novel by Jason Reynolds, 2020

References

External links
Danica Novgorodoff at Macmillan Publishers
Killing the Buddha
Center for Urban Pedagogy
NCCD Global
Making Policy Public
Best American Comics

Living people
1980 births
American graphic novelists
Yale University alumni
MacDowell Colony fellows
Artists from Louisville, Kentucky
American women novelists
Kentucky women artists
Kentucky women writers
Female comics writers
21st-century American women